William Waller Rucker (February 1, 1855 – May 30, 1936) was a U.S. Representative from Missouri.

Born near Covington, Virginia, Rucker moved with his parents to western Virginia in 1861. He attended the common schools and moved to Chariton County, Missouri, in 1873. He engaged in teaching in the district schools and eventually studied law. In 1876, he got admitted into the bar and commenced practice in Keytesville, Missouri. He served as prosecuting attorney of Chariton County from 1886–1892. and then served as judge of the twelfth circuit in 1892–1899.

Rucker was elected as a Democrat to the Fifty-sixth and to the eleven succeeding Congresses (March 4, 1899 – March 3, 1923). He served as chairman of the Committee on Election of President, Vice President, and Representatives (Sixty-second through Sixty-fifth Congresses). After losing the reelection in 1922 to the Sixty-eighth Congress, he resumed the practice of law in Keytesville, Missouri. He also engaged in agricultural pursuits.

Rucker died in Keytesville, Missouri, on May 30, 1936. He was interred in the City Cemetery.

References

External links

1855 births
1936 deaths
Missouri state court judges
People from Covington, Virginia
People from Keytesville, Missouri
People from Lewisburg, West Virginia
Farmers from Missouri
Missouri lawyers
Democratic Party members of the United States House of Representatives from Missouri